Joseph Ball (1 April 1927 – 6 October 1964) was an English rugby league footballer who played as a  or  for St Helens and Barrow.

Biography
Ball started his career with St Helens in 1943, playing 135 games for moving to Barrow in 1955, He spent six seasons with Barrow, Joe Ball played  in Barrow's 7-9 defeat by Leeds in the 1957 Challenge Cup Final during the 1956–57 season at Wembley Stadium, London on Saturday 11 May 1957, in front of a crowd of 76,318.

Ball's son, Ian, also played for Barrow.

After suffering from cancer, Ball died in hospital on 6 October 1964, aged 37.

References

External links
Saints Heritage Society profile

1927 births
1964 deaths
Barrow Raiders players
English rugby league players
Rugby league fullbacks
Rugby league players from St Helens, Merseyside
St Helens R.F.C. players